On August 28, 2004, following heavy rainfall, mudflows overran several houses in near Futrono, southern Chile. Chile Route T-55 between Futrono and Llifén was cut off by the landslide. At least three separate mudflows occurred in the event.

Three people were injured by the mudflows and about five thousand became temporarily isolated as roads were blocked.

See also
2002 Northern Chile floods and mudflow
2017 Villa Santa Lucía mudflow

References

August 2004 events in South America
2004 in Chile
2004 Futrono
Landslides in 2004
2004 Futrono